ITSE is a Panama Metro station on El Ramal, and extension of Line 2. It was opened on 16 March 2023 as part of the extension of Line 2 from Corredor Sur to Aeropuerto. 

The El Ramal trains terminate at Corredor Sur, there is no through traffic to Line 2. 

The station is located next to the campus of Instituto Tecnico Superior Especializado (ITSE), from where its name originates. This is an elevated station built above Avenida Domingo Díaz.

References

Panama Metro stations
2023 establishments in Panama
Railway stations opened in 2023